Mahdi Aliyu Mohammed Gusau (born 5 December 1981) is a Nigerian politician and lawyer, he served as deputy governor of Zamfara State from 2019 until his impeachment in 2022. He is the youngest person elected deputy governor in the Nigerian Fourth Republic at the age of 37. He is a son of General Aliyu Mohammed Gusau who is a former Minister of Defence, Chief of Army Staff and National Security Adviser of Nigeria.

Early life
Mohammed Gusau was born on 5 December 1981 in Gusau, Nigeria to then Lieutenant Colonel Aliyu Mohammed Gusau who was the Director of Military Intelligence.

Impeachment
On 23 February 2022, the Zamfara State House of Assembly impeached Gusau as deputy governor and immediately replaced him with Senator Hassan Nasiha the serving senator representing Zamfara Central Senatorial District. This followed the adoption of a motion by Majority Leader, Faruku Dosara (APC -Maradun 1), at a plenary in Gusau. The motion came shortly after the House adopted the report of Justice Haladu Tanko led panel, which investigated alleged gross misconduct and abuse of office against him. The Speaker Hon Nasiru Muazu Magarya, who presided over the sitting, directed the Clerk, Saidu Anka, to conduct a voice vote on the impeachment. Twenty of the 22 lawmakers present, voted in favour of the impeachment and he was pronounced impeached.

References 

Governors of Zamfara State
People from Zamfara State
Living people
Date of birth missing (living people)
1988 births